Katrin Yankova Taseva (born November 24, 1997) is a retired Bulgarian individual rhythmic gymnast. She is the 2017 European Silver medalist with Ribbon, 2019 Grand-Prix Final All-around bronze medalist, the 2019 World Cup series All-around and Ball winner and the double (2018, 2019) World Cup series Ribbon winner. Taseva had won multiple medals at the European Games and is also the 2018 Bulgarian National Champion and a four-time (2016, 2017, 2019, 2020) Bulgarian National All-around silver medalist.

Career 
Taseva was born in Samokov. A member of the Bulgarian National team since 2010, she appeared in international junior competitions in 2008. Taseva began competing at the 2015 FIG Rhythmic Gymnastics World Cup Series in Bucharest, Romania and Budapest, Hungary.

2016 season 
In 2016, Taseva competed in several World Cup and Grand Prix Series. She had her highest placement finishing 9th in the all-around at the 2016 Baku World Cup. She then finished 13th in the all-around at the 2016 European Championships. She was unable to compete at the 2016 Rio Olympics as Bulgaria qualified only 1 individual rhythmic gymnast that went to Neviana Vladinova who earned her Olympic qualifications at the 2015 World Championships.

2017 season 
In 2017 Season, Taseva made her breakthrough at the 2017 Kyiv Grand Prix where she finished 4th in the all-around and won the gold medal in ball final. She then competed at the 2017 Marbella Grand Prix where she finished 6th in the all-around and qualified to 3 apparatus final. At the 2017 Pesaro World Cup, Taseva finished 5th in the all-around ahead of teammate Neviana Vladinova. She also qualified to all the event finals finishing 4th in hoop, 5th in ball, 6th in ribbon and 8th in clubs. The following week, at the 2017 Tashkent World Cup, Taseva made her World Cup breakthrough, where she won her first all-around medal, a bronze, and in addition, a silver with clubs and a bronze with ball. At the 2017 Sofia World Cup, Taseva won another all-around medal, a silver, behind teammate Neviana Vladinova. In the finals, she also won a bronze with ribbon. At the 2017 European Championships, Taseva, along with Vladinova and the Bulgarian junior group (Maria Spasova, Bilyana Vezirska, Bilyana Pisova, Boyana Gelova and Galateya Gerova) won the team all-around bronze medal, behind Russia and Belarus. In the finals she also won a silver with ribbon and placed fourth with hoop. On August 5–7, Taseva finished 6th in the all-around behind teammate Neviana Vladinova at the 2017 Minsk World Challenge Cup, she qualified in 3 apparatus finals and won finished 6th in ball, 5th in both ribbon, and clubs. On August 11–13, Taseva again finished 6th in the all-around behind Vladinova at the 2017 Kazan World Challenge Cup, she qualified in 3 apparatus finals and finished 6th in ball, 5th in clubs, ribbon. On August 30 - September 3, Taseva and Neviana Vladinova represented in the individual competitions for Bulgaria at the 2017 World Championships in Pesaro, Italy; she placed 8th in qualifications and finished 10th in the all-around final. On November 5–6, Taseva competed at the 2017 Dalia Kutkaite Cup finishing 5th in the all-around.

2018 season 
In 2018 season, due to Vladinova's injury; Taseva became Bulgaria's leading rhythmic gymnast. She began her season at Baltic Hoop International Rhythmic Gymnastics Tournament in Riga, Latvia, finishing 3rd in all-around. She won gold with hoop and ribbon at the events finals. On March 17–19, Taseva competed at the 2018 Kyiv Grand Prix where she won the silver medal in the all-around behind Ekaterina Selezneva, she qualified in 3 apparatus finals: taking the silver with ball, ribbon and bronze with clubs. On March March 24–25, Taseva finished 4th in the all-around at the 2018 Thiais Grand Prix behind teammate Boryana Kaleyn. on March 30-April 1, Taseva began the world cup events competing at the 2018 Sofia World Cup finishing 4th in the all-around behind Israel's Linoy Ashram, she qualified in all the finals and bagged individual medals with gold in clubs, silver in hoop, ribbon and bronze in ball. On April 13–15, Taseva won the silver medal in the all-around at the 2018 Pesaro World Cup behind Dina Averina, she qualified to all apparatus finals; taking silver with ribbon, bronze with hoop, clubs and finished 4th in ball. On April 27–29, Taseva competed in a World Challenge Cup event at the 2018 Baku World Cup where she won finished 4th in the all-around behind Belarusian newcomer Anastasiia Salos, she qualified in 2 apparatus finals finishing 4th in ball and 7th in hoop.

2021 season 
Taseva represented Bulgaria at the 2020 Summer Olympics and finished first in the qualification for the individual all-around, making her the fourth reserve for the all-around final. On August 6, right after her Olympic performance, Katrin announced her retirement from competitive sport on her Instagram profile.

Routine music information

Competitive highlights
(Team competitions in seniors are held only at the World Championships, Europeans and other Continental Games.)

References

External links 
 
 
 
 

1997 births
Living people
People from Samokov
Bulgarian rhythmic gymnasts
Gymnasts at the 2019 European Games
European Games medalists in gymnastics
European Games silver medalists for Bulgaria
European Games bronze medalists for Bulgaria
Medalists at the Rhythmic Gymnastics European Championships
Medalists at the Rhythmic Gymnastics World Championships
Olympic gymnasts of Bulgaria
Gymnasts at the 2020 Summer Olympics
Sportspeople from Sofia Province
20th-century Bulgarian women
21st-century Bulgarian women